David Russell (9 January 1871 – 8 November 1952) was a Scottish footballer who played for Broxburn, Preston North End, Heart of Midlothian and Celtic at club level, having two spells at all four teams. He also appeared six times for Scotland.

A forward or centre half, Russell won the Scottish Football League title with both Hearts (1894–95) and Celtic (1897–98), becoming the first player to win the championship with different clubs, and similarly was the first to claim both the major domestic trophies at two clubs, lifting the Scottish Cup twice with Hearts (1891 and 1896) and once with Celtic in 1900 (followed by a defeat by his former team in the 1901 final).

References

Sources

External links

1871 births
1952 deaths
Scottish footballers
Scotland international footballers
Preston North End F.C. players
Heart of Midlothian F.C. players
Celtic F.C. players
Broxburn United F.C. players
Association football forwards
Association football central defenders
Scottish Football League players
Scottish Football League representative players
English Football League players
Footballers from North Lanarkshire
Sportspeople from Shotts